Duffield is a civil parish in the Amber Valley district of Derbyshire, England.  The parish contains 40 listed buildings that are recorded in the National Heritage List for England.  Of these, one is listed at Grade I, the highest of the three grades, one is at Grade II*, the middle grade, and the others are at Grade II, the lowest grade.  The parish contains the village of Duffield and the surrounding area.  Most of the listed buildings are houses, cottages and associated structures.  The other listed buildings include churches and chapels, bridges, mileposts, buildings in Duffield Cemetery, and a war memorial.


Key

Buildings

References

Citations

Sources

 

Lists of listed buildings in Derbyshire